The Southern Rocky Mountains are a major subregion of the Rocky Mountains of North America located in the southeastern portion of the U.S. state of Wyoming, the central and western portions of Colorado, the northern portion of New Mexico, and extreme eastern portions of Utah. The Southern Rocky Mountains are also commonly known as the Southern Rockies, and since the highest peaks are located in the State of Colorado, they are sometimes known as the Colorado Rockies, although many important ranges and peaks rise in the other three states. The Southern Rockies include the highest mountain ranges of the Rocky Mountains and include all 30 of the highest major peaks of the Rockies.

The Southern Rocky Mountains are generally divided from the Western Rocky Mountains by the Green River and the Colorado River below the Green River. The Southern Rockies are divided from the Central Rocky Mountains by South Pass in Wyoming and the drainage running east from the pass down the Sweetwater River and the North Platte River; and the drainage running southwest from the pass down Pacific Creek and Sandy Creek to the Green River. This divide between the Southern Rockies and the Central Rockies provided the lowest elevation traverse of the Rocky Mountain region for the historic Oregon Trail, the Mormon Trail, and the California Trail. The southern end of the Rocky Mountains are considered to be the Jemez Mountains and the southern Sangre de Cristo Mountains of New Mexico. Mountains south of here in N.M. are classified as the Arizona/New Mexico Mountains using the EPA Level III Ecoregions System.

This article defines a significant summit as a summit with at least  of topographic prominence, and a major summit as a summit with at least  of topographic prominence. An ultra-prominent summit is a summit with at least  of topographic prominence.

All elevations in this article include an elevation adjustment from the National Geodetic Vertical Datum of 1929 (NGVD 29) to the North American Vertical Datum of 1988 (NAVD 88). For further information, please see this United States National Geodetic Survey note.


Mountain ranges
The following table lists the mountain ranges and subranges of the Southern Rocky Mountains with their highest summit.

Mountain peaks

Highest summits
The following sortable table lists the 57 mountain peaks of the Southern Rocky Mountains with at least  of topographic elevation and at least  of topographic prominence.

Most prominent summits
The following sortable table lists the three ultra prominent summits of the Southern Rocky Mountains (with at least  of topographic prominence.)

Most isolated summits
The following sortable table lists the 15 most topographically isolated peaks of the Southern Rocky Mountains with a topographic isolation of at least  and a topographic prominence of at least .

Easternmost summits
The following sortable table lists progressively the easternmost Rocky Mountain summits of their respective elevation.

Mountain passes

The following sortable table lists the paved mountain passes and highway summits of the Southern Rocky Mountains.

See also

Lists of mountains
Mountain peaks of the Rocky Mountains

Notes

References

External links
National Geodetic Survey (NGS)
NGS Datasheets
NGVD 29 to NAVD 88 online elevation converter @ NGS
Geodetic Glossary @ NGS
United States Geological Survey (USGS)

World Mountain Encyclopedia @ peakware.com
peaklist.org
summitpost.org

Climate of the Rocky Mountains
+
Geography of Colorado
Rocky Mountains
Geography of Utah
Geography of Wyoming
Geography of New Mexico